John Ernest Sarno Jr. (June 23, 1923 – June 22, 2017) was Professor of Rehabilitation Medicine, New York University School of Medicine, and attending physician at the Howard A. Rusk Institute of Rehabilitation Medicine, New York University Medical Center. He graduated from Kalamazoo College, Kalamazoo, Michigan in 1943, and Columbia University College of Physicians and Surgeons in 1950. In 1965, he was appointed the director of the Outpatient Department at the Rusk Institute.

Sarno originated the term tension myositis syndrome (TMS) to name a psychosomatic condition producing pain, particularly back pain. The theory of TMS and Sarno's treatment of it have been hailed by many lay people as life-changing. A 2017 book on back pain treatments described Sarno as the "rock star of the back world". A documentary on his life and work titled All the Rage (Saved by Sarno) was released in 2016.

Biography
Sarno graduated from Newton High School at age 16. He repeated senior year and graduated again from the private Horace Mann 
School in the Bronx. In 1943, he joined the army and worked in field hospitals in Europe during World War II. 

Dr. Sarno married Penny Patt. They had three children: Lindianne, Lauren and David. They divorced in 1966. He remarried in 1967, this time to Martha Lamarque, a colleague at the Rusk Institute. They had one daughter, Christina.

Tension myositis syndrome

Sarno's most notable achievement is the development, diagnosis, and treatment of tension myoneural syndrome (TMS), which is currently not accepted by mainstream medicine. According to Sarno, TMS is a psychosomatic illness causing chronic back, neck, and limb pain which is not relieved by standard medical treatments. He includes other ailments, such as gastrointestinal problems, dermatological disorders and repetitive-strain injuries as TMS related.  Sarno states that he has successfully treated over ten thousand patients at the Rusk Institute by educating them on his beliefs of a psychological and emotional basis to their pain and symptoms.  Sarno's theory is, in part, that the pain or GI symptoms are an unconscious "distraction" to aid in the repression of deep unconscious emotional issues. Sarno believes that when patients think about what may be upsetting them in their unconscious, they can defeat their minds' strategy to repress these powerful emotions; when the symptoms are seen for what they are, the symptoms then serve no purpose, and they go away. Supporters of Sarno's work hypothesize an inherent difficulty in performing the clinical trials needed to prove or disprove the diagnosis, since it is difficult to use clinical trials with psychosomatic illnesses.

Sarno wrote about his experience in this area in his first book on TMS, Mind Over Back Pain. His second book, Healing Back Pain: The Mind-Body Connection, has sold over 150,000 copies. Sarno's most recent book, The Divided Mind: The Epidemic of Mindbody Disorders, features chapters by six other physicians and addresses the entire spectrum of psychosomatic disorders and the history of psychosomatic medicine.

Statistical studies of TMS treatment
Sarno's books describe two follow-up surveys of his TMS patients.  The first in 1982 interviewed 177 patients selected randomly from those Sarno treated in the preceding three years.  76 percent stated that they were leading normal and effectively pain-free lives.  A second follow-up study in 1987 restricted the population surveyed to those with herniated discs identified on CT-scans, and 88% of the 109 randomly selected patients stated that they were free of pain one to three years after TMS treatment.

In 2007, David Schechter (a medical doctor and former student and research assistant of Sarno) published a  study of TMS treatment showing a 54% reduction in the average pain intensity scores for a cohort of 51 chronic back pain patients, whose average pain duration before the study was 9 years.  In terms of statistical significance and success rate, the study outperformed similar studies of other psychological interventions for chronic back pain. However, the study appeared in Alternative Therapies in Health and Medicine, a journal that accepts both peer-reviewed and non-peer-reviewed articles. The journal’s website advocates numerous pseudo-sciences that have been debunked by mainstream medical journals.

Notable patients
Notable patients of Sarno include radio personalities Howard Stern and Tom Scharpling, comedian Larry David, actress Anne Bancroft, filmmaker Terry Zwigoff, 20/20 co-anchor John Stossel, television writer Janette Barber, and Sopranos actor Michael Imperioli. Many of them have praised Sarno and his work highly. Stern dedicated his first book in part to Sarno. Stern, David, and Stossel are featured in a documentary about Sarno.

Hearing before the U. S. Senate Committee on Health, Education, and Pensions
On February 14, 2012, Sarno appeared before the U. S. Senate Committee on Health, Education, and Pensions as part of a hearing "Pain in America:  Exploring Challenges to Relief". The committee was chaired by Senator Tom Harkin (D-Iowa), who was very supportive of the mind-body connection espoused by Sarno based on his personal experience and that of a niece with fibromyalgia. Transcripts of the testimony from Sarno and the other witnesses, as well as a video recording of the hearing, were subsequently posted by the Committee.

Bibliography

Footnotes

External links

1923 births
2017 deaths
American health and wellness writers
American medical writers
American male non-fiction writers
Physicians from New York (state)
Columbia University Vagelos College of Physicians and Surgeons alumni
Kalamazoo College alumni
New York University Grossman School of Medicine faculty
People from Williamsburg, Brooklyn
Writers from Brooklyn